Gavzan Mahalleh (also Romanized as Gāvzan Maḩalleh) is a village in Babol Kenar Rural District, Babol Kenar District, Babol County, Mazandaran Province, Iran. At the 2006 census, its population was 472, in 127 families.

References 

Populated places in Babol County